The Abingdon, built in 1902 and 1903, is an English automobile made by John Child Meredith of Birmingham, who normally manufactured ignition equipment and accessories.

The range consisted of a  hp single-cylinder-engined two-seater with two-speed gearbox and chain drive.  There was also the Meredith model with a 2-cylinder 9 hp engine and a 4-seater tonneau body.

See also
 List of car manufacturers of the United Kingdom

Further reading

Defunct motor vehicle manufacturers of England
Veteran vehicles
Defunct companies based in Birmingham, West Midlands

Cars introduced in 1902